The 1981 Mexican League season was the 57th season in the history of the Mexican League in baseball. It was contested by 16 teams, evenly divided in North and South zones. The season started on March and ended on 9 September with the last game of the Serie Final, where Diablos Rojos del México defeated Broncos de Reynosa to win the championship.

Standings

North

South

Postseason

League leaders

Awards

References

Mexican League season
Mexican League season
Mexican League seasons